Frederiksberg Town Hall is the administrative centre of Frederiksberg Municipality, an independent municipality located in inner Copenhagen, Denmark. 800 employees work in the building.

There are tours of the town hall on the first Saturday every month. They include a visit to the tower which rises 60 metres above street level and has good views of Frederiksberg and across Copenhagen.

History
Frederiksberg's first town hall was in Falkoner Allé, one block to the north of the current town hall square. As the population boomed in the first part of the 20th century, it became too small to house a modern administration. It was therefore decided to build a new town hall and Henning Hansen was charged with its design. Construction of the new town hall began in 1942 but was delayed by shortage of building materials during World War II. After Henning Hansen's death in 1945,  Carl H. Nimb and Helge Holm took over the responsibility for completing his building. It was inaugurated in 1952.

Architecture
The building is 60 m wide and 120 metre long and the tower rises to 60 m above street level.

The interior contains Town Hall auditorium, grand ceremonial hall, Wedding Room, and an assembly hall used by the city council. The municipal archives are located in the basement.

Town Hall Square
A new plaza in front of the town hall was established in connection with its inauguration. It has a water feature by Anker Hoffmann.

See also
 List of mayors of Frederiksberg Municipality

References

External links
Frederiksberg Kommune

Government buildings completed in 1953
City and town halls in Copenhagen
City and town halls in Denmark
Buildings and structures in Frederiksberg Municipality